This is a list of the National Register of Historic Places listings in Yuma County, Arizona.  It is intended to be a complete list of the properties and districts on the National Register of Historic Places in Yuma County, Arizona, United States.  The locations of National Register properties and districts for which the latitude and longitude coordinates are included below, may be seen in a map.

There are 57 properties and districts listed on the National Register in the county, including 1 that is also a National Historic Landmark.  Another three properties were once listed, but have since been removed.

Listings county-wide

|}

Former listings

|}

See also
 List of National Historic Landmarks in Arizona
 National Register of Historic Places listings in Arizona

References

External links
 
 

Yuma
 
History of Yuma County, Arizona